Prade is a settlement east of Koper in the Littoral region of Slovenia.

History
Prade was a hamlet of Bertoki until 1989, when it was administratively separated and made a settlement in its own right.

References

External links
Prade on Geopedia

Populated places in the City Municipality of Koper